Karl Marx Square Water Tower is a water tower in Leninsky District of Novosibirsk, Russia. It was built in 1939.

History
In 1930, Zaobsky District was formed in Novosibirsk, which included the settlements of the left bank of the Ob. In 1938–1939, a water tower was built to ensure uninterrupted water supply to residents of the district. The tower also provided water for the Sibselmash Plant.

At first, the water tower was surrounded by potato fields; later, residential buildings appeared here.

In the middle of the 20th century, the tower ceased to function and stood abandoned until 1985, after which it was occupied by a youth club.

In the 1990s, the tower housed the NTN-4 television company, which ceased to exist in 2005. Inside the tower, the studio interior of the NTN-4 has been preserved, and its logos have also been preserved on the tower fence.

Gallery

External links
 Водонапорная башня на пл. Маркса. Novosibdom.ru.
 В Новосибирске продают за 50 млн знаменитую башню, в которой бывал Михаил Горбачёв.. НГС.НОВОСТИ.

Water towers in Novosibirsk
1939 establishments in Russia
Towers completed in 1939